Hawaiian Beaches is a census-designated place (CDP) in Hawaii County, Hawaii, United States located in the District of Puna. The population was 4,280 at the 2010 census, up from 3,709 at the 2000 census.

Geography
Hawaiian Beaches is located on the east side of the island of Hawaii at  (19.549247, -154.907587). It is bordered to the north by Hawaiian Paradise Park, to the south by Pahoa and Nanawale Estates, and to the east by the Pacific Ocean. Hawaii Route 130 forms the western border of the community and leads north  to Hilo.

Demographics

As of the census of 2000, there were 3,709 people, 1,192 households, and 923 families residing in the CDP. The racial makeup of the CDP was 27.99% White, 0.65% African American, 0.49% Native American, 16.69% Asian, 15.45% Pacific Islander, 1.05% from other races, and 37.69% from two or more races. Hispanic or Latino of any race were 15.64% of the population.

There were 1,192 households, out of which 37.0% had children under the age of 18 living with them, 54.3% were married couples living together, 17.6% had a female householder with no husband present, and 22.5% were non-families. 17.5% of all households were made up of individuals, and 6.4% had someone living alone who was 65 years of age or older. The average household size was 3.11 and the average family size was 3.49.

In the CDP the population was spread out, with 31.7% under the age of 18, 8.5% from 18 to 24, 24.2% from 25 to 44, 24.5% from 45 to 64, and 11.2% who were 65 years of age or older. The median age was 34 years. For every 100 females, there were 98.9 males. For every 100 females age 18 and over, there were 96.7 males.

The median income for a household in the CDP was $28,467, and the median income for a family was $30,104. Males had a median income of $30,037 versus $21,886 for females. The per capita income for the CDP was $11,267. About 23.8% of families and 28.6% of the population were below the poverty line, including 38.3% of those under age 18 and 13.8% of those age 65 or over.

References

Census-designated places in Hawaii County, Hawaii
Populated places on Hawaii (island)
Populated coastal places in Hawaii